is a city located in Hyōgo Prefecture, Japan. , the city had an estimated population of 108,452 in 47018 households and a population density of 520 persons per km².

Geography
The highest elevation point in the city is 697meters at Mt. Mine, and the lowest elevation point is 116 meters. The northern and eastern parts of the city are mountainous. In the past, it had the appearance of a typical farming village with rural scenery, but due to the development of large-scale housing complexes since the 1980s and the convenience of double-track electrification of the JR Fukuchiyama Line, it has rapidly become a satellite city of Osaka and Kobe.

Rivers
The Muko River runs through Sanda from Sasayama City in the north to Osaka Bay in the southeast.
The size of the drainage basin is 496 km2. The river is host to events and festivals throughout the year.

Neighbouring municipalities 
Hyōgo Prefecture
Kobe
Takarazuka
Miki
 Katō
Takarazuka
Miki
Tamba-Sasayama
Inagawa

Climate
Sanda has a humid subtropical climate (Köppen climate classification Cfa) with hot summers and cool to cold winters. Precipitation is significantly higher in summer than in winter, though on the whole lower than most parts of Honshū, and there is no significant snowfall.

Demographics
Per Japanese census data, the population of Sanda in 2020 was 109,238 people. Sanda has been conducting censuses since 1920.

History
The area of Sanda was part of ancient Settsu Province, and has been inhabited since the Japanese Paleolithic period.  The name "Sanda" has been in use since long ago. Records found within a Buddhist Maitreya statue in the ancient Konshin-ji Temple read: "These areas are decreed as Matsuyama's land, which includes Onden, Hiden and Keiden, which are three rice fields, and the land is thus renamed Sanda." In Japanese, "san" means three and "ta" (pronounced "da" following "n") means rice field. The earliest document on record which refers to Sanda is from 1477.

Sanda Castle was erected during the Muromachi period. A castle town later developed during the Azuchi-Momoyama period, and under the Edo Period Tokugawa shogunate. Sanda was the center of the 36,000 koku Sanda Domain, ruled through most of its history by the Kuki clan.

Following the Meiji restoration, the town of Sanda was established with the creation of the modern municipalities system.  The town prospered thanks to the completion of a railroad system which connected the town and the surrounding areas. In 1956, the towns of Miwa, Hirono, Ono, and Takahira merged into the town of Sanda. Finally, Sanda annexed Aino, itself a merger of towns Ai and Honjō, in 1957. Sanda was upgraded from a town to a city on July 1, 1958.

Government
Sanda has a mayor-council form of government with a directly elected mayor and a unicameral city council of 22 members. Sanda  contributes two members to the Hyōgo Prefectural Assembly. In terms of national politics, the city is within Hyōgo 5th districts of the lower house of the Diet of Japan.

General hospitals
Sanda City Hospital/Keyakidai
Hyogo Chuo Hospital/Ohara

Economy
Sanda has a mixed economy of commerce, light manufacturing and agriculture. It is increasingly a commuter town for Osaka and Kobe.

Industries
Mitsubishi Electric (Melco) has a large R&D and production campus in Sanda. Many large industries in Sanda city are concentrated in the Hokusetsu Sanda Technopark.
The industries represented primarily include pharmaceuticals, chemicals, food, and distribution.
Some specific companies based in the Technopark are:
Iris Ohyama (Plastics/chemicals)
Morita (fire engine manufacturing)
Asahi Foods (food)
Soft99 Corporation (car wax/chemicals)
Nippon Polyester (polyester/chemicals)
Hayashi (tower/chemicals)
Kishida Chemical (chemicals)
Tamapori (polystyrene/chemicals)
Kiribai Kobayashi (drug-manufacturing, disposable heating pad/chemicals)
Hokuseisha (printing)
Sastech (stainless steel)
Ueno Drug (drug/chemicals)

Education
Sanda has 20 public elementary schools, nine public middle schools and four high schools operated by the city government, and four public high schools operated by the Hyōgo Prefectural Board of Education. In addition, the prefecture also operates two special education schools for the handicapped. The Minatogawa College, a junior college, is located in the city

High schools (grades 10-12)
Arima High School
Hokusetsu Sanda High School
Sanda Seiryo High School
Sanda Shounkan High School
Sanda Gakuen High School (private)
Sanda Shosei High School (private)

Junior high schools (grades 7-9)
Keyakidai Junior High School
Yurinokidai Junior High School
Hasama Junior High School
Uenodai Junior High School
Nagasaka Junior High School
Hakkei Junior High School
Fuji Junior High School
Ai Junior High School
Sanda Gakuen Junior High School (private)

Elementary schools (grades 1-6)
Akashiadai Elementary School
Keyakidai Elementary School
Suzukakedai Elementary School
Tsutsujigaoka Elementary School
Yurinokidai Elementary School
Gakuen Elementary School
Hasama Elementary School
Hirono Elementary School
Takahira Elementary School
Sanda Elementary School
Miwa Elementary School
Shidehara Elementary School
Ono Elementary School
Matsugaoka Elementary School
Fuji Elementary School
Muko Elementary School
Moushi Elementary School
Honjyo Elementary School
Yayoi Elementary School
Ai Elementary School

Special schools
Uenogahara Special School
Hyogo Prefectural Koto High School for Students with Special Needs

Libraries
Sanda has three libraries:
Sanda City Library
Sanda Woodytown Library
Sanda-Ai Library

Sanda city also has a mobile library called "Soyokaze". It began service on January 19, 1994 and has about 3,500 books.

Transportation

Railways 
 JR West - Fukuchiyama Line
  -   -  -  - 
 Kobe Electric Railway - Shintetsu Sanda Line
  -  -  
 Kobe Electric Railway - Shintetsu Kōen-Toshi Line
  -  -  -

Highways 
  Maizuru-Wakasa Expressway

 Hanshin Expressway Ikeda Route

Sister city relations

Sanda is twinned with:
 Blue Mountains, Australia
 Jeju City, South Korea
 Kittitas County, United States

Local attractions
Museum of Nature and Human Activities
The museum's theme is the "symbiosis of people and nature". It opened in Flowertown on October 10, 1992, and is known as "Hitohaku" in Japanese. It is one of the largest public museums in Japan.

 Renge-ji, a Shingon sect Buddhist temple
 Satonone Hall 
Satonone Hall is a large performance venue in Sanda. It was completed in March 2007. The facility features a large hall, small hall, rehearsal rooms, and display rooms. The interior is decorated in soft tones and motifs symbolic of the harvest of Satoyama,  persimmons, ears of rice, water, and wind.

Hanayamano-yu
An outdoor bath which features hinoki and an arrangement of garden rocks. There are separate baths for men and women.

Kumanonosato
Features both Bali-style and Japanese-style outdoor baths.

Arima Fuji Park
Located in Fukushima, Sanda and opened in 2001. The park is named for Mt. Arima Fuji, which is located within the park. There are three parks within the park: a waterfront park, a forest park, and a grassland park. 

Shiroyama
A multi-use sports facility featuring a tennis court, ball park, athletic field, and gym.

Events
Sanda Matsuri
Sanda Matsuri is the largest annual event in Sanda. There is a large firework display with over 2,500 fireworks. It takes place on August 4 near the Muko River.

Hyakkoku Odori
Hyakkoku Odori takes place in late November near the Komausahachiman Shrine.

Sanda Akindo Matsuri
Sanda Akindo Matsuri takes place in early December in the shopping district in front of Sanda station.

Sanda Nōgyō Matsuri
Sanda Nōgyō Matsuri takes place on November 3 and 4.

Tenjinsai
Tenjinsai takes place in late July in Sanda Tenman Shrine. In the morning, there is a festival, followed by a special lion dance in the afternoon.

Special products
Sanda beef
 has historically been produced in Hyōgo at the rate of about 1,000 heads of cattle per year. It is regarded as being of higher quality than Kobe beef.

Mōshi tea
Mōshi tea is produced in May and June and is shipped to points all over Japan. It is sold at local stores as well, such as Paskaru-Sanda, Itunoeki-Inagawa, Kumazeinosato and Kobe-sogou.

Notable people from Sanda
Kawamoto Kōmin (Rangaku scholar)
Aida Shinnichi （singer-songwriter）
Itokin ET-KING (musician)
Konoda Reo（pro-baseball player・Fukuoka SoftBank Hawks）
Hayashi Keisuke (Vissel Kobe)
Nanjo Yuka（model）

References

External links

 Sanda City official website 
 Sanda City official website

Cities in Hyōgo Prefecture
Sanda, Hyōgo